Kildare–Wicklow was a parliamentary constituency represented in Dáil Éireann, the lower house of the Irish parliament or Oireachtas from 1921 to 1923. The constituency elected 5 deputies (Teachtaí Dála, commonly known as TDs) to the Dáil, on the system of proportional representation by means of the single transferable vote (PR-STV).

History and boundaries
The constituency was created under the Government of Ireland Act 1920 to elect members to the House of Commons of Southern Ireland and first used at the 1921 general election to return the members of the 2nd Dáil. It covered all of County Kildare and County Wicklow.

Kildare–Wicklow was used again for the 1922 general election to the Third Dáil. Under the Electoral Act 1923, it was replaced by the two new single county constituencies of Kildare and Wicklow.

TDs

Elections

1922 general election

1921 general election

|}

See also
Dáil constituencies
Politics of the Republic of Ireland
Historic Dáil constituencies
Elections in the Republic of Ireland

References

External links
Oireachtas Members Database

Dáil constituencies in the Republic of Ireland (historic)
Historic constituencies in County Kildare
Historic constituencies in County Wicklow
1921 establishments in Ireland
1923 disestablishments in Ireland
Constituencies established in 1921
Constituencies disestablished in 1923